"Only Words I Know" is a song by English boy band Blue. It was released on 13 June 2005 as the third and final single from their first greatest hits album, Best of Blue (2004). The song was produced by Copenhaniacs and reached number two in Italy, where it was re-recorded for the Italian market with the subtitle "Italian version". The song also peaked at number 55 on the German Singles Chart.

Track listings
European CD single
 "Only Words I Know" (album version) – 3:36
 "Only Words I Know" (Italian version) – 3:36

Italian CD single
 "Only Words I Know" (Italian version) – 3:36
 "Only Words I Know" (album version) – 3:35
 "Too Close" (Blacksmith R'N'B club rub) – 5:41
 "Get Down on It" (Obi & Josh mix) – 4:01

Credits and personnel
Credits are taken from the Best of Blue album booklet.

Studios
 Recorded at CPH Studios (Copenhagen, Denmark), Townhouse, The Dairy (London, England), and Love 4 Music
 Mixed at DEEKAY Studios (Copenhagen, Denmark)
 Mastered at Alchemy Mastering and 360 Mastering (London, England)

Personnel

 Simon Webbe – writing
 Copenhaniacs – keys, drums, percussion, programming, production, recording
 Philip Dencker – writing
 Jens Lomholt – writing
 Frederik Nordsø – writing, guitar
 Remee – writing
 Ali Tennant – writing
 Martin M. Larsson – mixing
 John Davis – mastering (Alchemy)
 Dick Beetham – mastering (360)

Charts

Weekly charts

Year-end charts

Certifications

References

2004 songs
2005 singles
Blue (English band) songs
Innocent Records singles
Songs written by Ali Tennant
Songs written by Remee
Songs written by Simon Webbe
Virgin Records singles